Villacondide is one of seven parishes (administrative divisions) in the Coaña municipality, within the province and autonomous community of Asturias, in northern Spain. 

The population is 339 (INE 2007).

Villages
La Ronda (A Ronda)
Busnovo
El Estelleiro (L'Estelleiro)
Porto
Sabariz (Savariz)
Tarrebarre
Teijedo (Teixedo)
Villacondide
Villardá

References

Parishes in Coaña